Álvaro del Amo (born 1942) is a Spanish dramatist, novelist, screenwriter, and music critic.

His work as a playwright is partly unpublished, but in his productions (Geografía, 1985 and Motor, 1988) one can appreciate a translation of the language and the cinematographic aesthetic to the stage.

As a narrator, he begins with Mutis (1980, La Gaya Ciencia). Other works of his are Libreto (1985), Contagio (1991), El Horror (finalist for the Herralde Prize in 1993), Incandescencia (collection of short stories, 1998) and Los melómanos (2000). He was also the scriptwriter of Amantes, by Vicente Aranda, a play that he brought to the stage in 2014 at the Valle-Inclán theatre in Madrid.

Sources

References 

1942 births
Living people
Spanish dramatists and playwrights
Spanish male dramatists and playwrights
Spanish novelists
Spanish male novelists
Spanish male screenwriters